Món cuốn refer to Vietnamese roll and wrap dishes which include a variety of ingredients rolled in banh trang or vegetable leaf; it may include vegetable and herb leaves, or other kinds of vegetable. The range of possible ingredients allows people to select only what they want, according to their taste. The dish is always served with a dipping sauce called nước chấm.

Món cuốn is a finger food in which the ingredients are cooked but the diners assemble their own rolls. It is also a real variety of fast food because of its fast-cooking process but invented from the old days.

Varieties
Banh cuon
Bò bía
Bò cuốn lá lốt - grilled meat wrapped in lolot leaves
Bánh ướt thịt nướng - thin steamed rolled rice pancake with roast meat and salad.
Cuốn cá nục
Cuốn tôm chua thịt luộc
Cuốn ốc gạo
Cuốn cá lóc hấp nước dừa
Cuốn đầu heo ngâm chua
Cuốn diếp
Chả giò rế
Cuốn ốc gạo
Cuốn nem nướng - made with grilled pork meatballs
Spring roll
Summer roll
Trảng Bàng dew-wetted rice paper

References

Vietnamese cuisine